Wolfgang Hilbig (31 August 1941  2 June 2007) was a German writer and poet.

Life 
Wolfgang Hilbig was born in Meuselwitz, Germany. His grandfather had emigrated from Biłgoraj (Congress Poland, Russian Empire) before the First World War. In 1942, his father was reported missing at Stalingrad, leaving behind Hilbig and his mother.

After his schooling in his home town, Hilbig began to work at a boring mill. Later, after military service, he worked as a tool maker and in assembly construction at the Meuselwitz lignite mine.

In 1978, Hilbig moved to East Berlin, and in 1979 he became an independent writer. In 1985, he left the GDR with a travel visa and moved to West Germany.

He lived in Berlin after the fall of the Berlin Wall and married writer and translator Natascha Wodin in 1994. They had one daughter and divorced in 2002.

Hilbig died from cancer in 2007 and is buried in the Dorotheenstädtischen Cemetery in Berlin.

Work 
At first Hilbig favoured poetry, but his works remained widely unpublished in the GDR. He received attention from the West however, as a result of his poems in the anthology Cries For Help From The Other Side (1978). His first volume of poetry, Absence (1979) was published by S. Fischer Verlag in Frankfurt am Main. For this, Hilbig was fined.

At the end of the 1970s, Hilbig gave up his day job and began to work exclusively as a writer. With the support of Franz Fühmann, a few of his poems were printed in a GDR newspaper for the first time. His prose anthology, Unterm Neomond (1982) was published by S. Fischer, followed by Stimme Stimme (1983), a prose and poetry anthology published by Reclam in Leipzig.

In 1985 Hilbig gained a visa for West Germany valid until 1990. During this time he published not only further poetry and prose, but also his first novel, Eine Übertragung (1989), which was received well by literary critics.

Even after reunification, the main themes of his work remained the dual-existence of working and writing in the GDR and the search for individuality. His further works include: his second novel, Ich (1993); his collections of short stories, such as Die Arbeit an den Öfen (1994) and Die Kunde von den Bäumen (1996); and his third novel Das Provisorium (2000). Autobiographical themes are often prevalent.

Awards 
 1983 Hanau Brothers-Grimm-Prize
 1989 Ingeborg Bachmann Prize for Eine Übertragung
 1993 Brandenburg Literature Prize
 1997 Fontane Prize (the Berlin Academy of Arts) 
 2002 Georg Büchner Prize

Bibliography

Poetry 
Abwesenheit (1979)
Die Versprengung (1986)
Bilder vom Erzählen (2001)

Novels, novellas, short stories 
 Unterm Neomond (1982)
Der Brief (1985)
Die Territorien der Seele (1986)
Die Weiber (1987). The Females, trans. Isabel Fargo Cole (2018).
Eine Übertragung (1989)
Über den Tonfall (1990)
Alte Abdeckerei (1991). Old Rendering Plant, trans. Isabel Fargo Cole (2017).
Die Kunde von den Bäumen (1992). The Tidings of the Trees, trans. Isabel Fargo Cole (2018).
Grünes grünes Grab (1993)
»Ich« (1993). 'I''', trans. Isabel Fargo Cole (2015), Ja, trans. into Polish by Ryszard WojnakowskiDie Arbeit an den Öfen (1994)Das Provisorium (2000). The Interim, trans. Isabel Fargo Cole (2021).Der Schlaf der Gerechten (2002). The Sleep of the Righteous, trans. Isabel Fargo Cole (2015).Sphinx (2019)

 Further reading 
 „Büchner-Preisträger Wolfgang Hilbig gestorben.“ In: Die Welt, 2 June 2007, retrieved, 7 February 2011.
 "Chronologische Daten nach Andrea Jäger: Wolfgang Hilbig". In: dies.: Schriftsteller aus der DDR. Ausbürgerungen und Übersiedlungen von 1961 bis 1989. Autorenlexikon. Schriften zur Europa- und Deutschlandforschung. Hrsg. v. . Bd. 1. Frankfurt Main 1995. S. 201
 : "Von Lärchenau über Hilbig nach Berlin, Rezensionen u.a. zu Karen Lohse, Eine motivische Biographie". In: Eulenspiegel, 55./63. Jg., Nr. 7/08, S. 77.
 Autorenporträt Wolfgang Hilbig im Literaturkalender von FAZ.NET, retrieved, 7 February 2011.
 : LUCHS 185 – Die Jury von ZEIT und Radio Bremen stellt vor: Franz Fühmann und , „Anna, genannt Humpelhexe“. As of 29 February 2002, retrieved, 7 February 2011.
 Cornelia Geissler: "Der Unbehauste – Wolfgang Hilbig ist mit seinem neuen Roman im Westen angekommen". In: Berliner Zeitung, 19 February 2000, retrieved, 7 February 2011.
 Sächsische Akademie der Künste: Verstorbene Mitglieder. Retrieved, 6 February 2011.
 Bayerische Akademie der Schönen Künste: Nekrolog. Retrieved, 6 February 2011.
 Preismitteilung beim Land Brandenburg. Retrieved, 6 February 2011.
 Ursula März: "In der deutschen Vorhölle. Rezension des Romans Das Provisorium", in Die Zeit, Nr. 9/2000. Retrieved, 6 February 2011.
 Ingo Arend: "Die Anrufung des toten Gottes. Rezension des Romans Das Provisorium", in Freitag'', 24 March 2000, retrieved, 6 February 2011.
 Dietmar Jacobsen: Die Wahrheit des Erfundenen. Rezension des Erzählungsbandes Der Schlaf der Gerechten. bei lyrikwelt.de, retrieved, 6 February 2011. Inhaltsangabe

References

1941 births
2007 deaths
East German writers
German male poets
German male novelists
20th-century German poets
20th-century German novelists
German-language poets
Writers from Thuringia
Socialist Unity Party of Germany members
Georg Büchner Prize winners
Ingeborg Bachmann Prize winners
German people of Polish descent
People from Meuselwitz